is a Japanese actor, tarento and comedian. He graduated from Matsuda High School. He is nicknamed . He is represented with Hercules.

Filmography

Variety

TV dramas

Films

Voice acting

Internet dramas

Original videos

Radio

Music videos

Advertisements

References

External links
 – Hercules 
Abayo Nikki (DHC Blog) – Until 28 December 2010 – Archived on 12 January 2011 
Shingo Yanagisawa Selection: Abayo!! Shōkai Page (Pony Canyon) 
Shingo Yanagisawa Climax Kōshien!! Shōkai Page (Pony Canyon) 
Shingo Yanagisawa at all cinema 

Japanese comedians
Japanese male voice actors
People from Odawara
Male actors from Kanagawa Prefecture
1962 births
Living people